The 1989 Copa Libertadores Final was a two-legged football match-up to determine the 1989 Copa Libertadores champion.

Qualified teams

Venues

Match details

First leg

Second leg

External links
CONMEBOL's official website

1
Copa Libertadores Finals
Copa Libertadores Final 1989
Copa Libertadores Final 1989